This is a list of number-one songs in 1986 on the Italian charts compiled weekly by the Italian Hit Parade Singles Chart.

Chart history

Number-one artists

References

1986
1986 in Italian music
1986 record charts